Chrysophyllum inornatum is a plant in the family Sapotaceae, native to Brazil.

Description
The species is locally harvested for its timber and fruit.

Distribution and habitat
Chrysophyllum inornatum is native to southern Brazil. Its habitat is by rivers in coastal forests.

References

inornatum
Flora of South Brazil
Plants described in 1838
Taxa named by Carl Friedrich Philipp von Martius